Pedro Chacón y Chacón (c. 1789 – c. 1854) was a Spanish general, most notable for participation in the First Carlist War, in which he was one of the generals fighting to defend the legitimacy of Isabella II of Spain against the Carlists in the Murcia area, where he was commander in chief. He was possibly born in Murcia.

References

Spanish generals
Military personnel of the First Carlist War
1780s births
1850s deaths
People from Murcia